This is a list of holidays in Burkina Faso.

Public holidays

References 

Burkinabé culture
Burkina Faso
Burkina Faso